The Faculty of Sciences of the University of Szeged.

Notable persons
István Apáthy, zoology 
Zoltán Bay, physicist 
Jenő Cholnoky, geography 
Lipót Fejér, mathematics 
István Györffy, botany 
Alfréd Haar, mathematics 
László Kalmár, computer science 
Béla Kerékjártó, geometry 
László Lovász, mathematics; Wolf Prize 1999, Knuth Prize 199, Kyoto prize 2010 
Tibor Radó, mathematics 
László Rédei, mathematics 
Frigyes Riesz, mathematics 
Brúnó F. Straub, biology 
Béla Szőkefalvi-Nagy, mathematics 

Faculties of the University of Szeged